Kari Bøge (born 19 August 1950) is a Norwegian poet, novelist, short story writer, children's writer and illustrator. She was born in Stockholm, a daughter of Max Harlow Bøge and Ida Detlefsen. She was first married to Rolf Wibe, and later to Arild Stubhaug.

She made her literary debut in 1971 with the poetry collection Asmorelda. Her tetralogy Viviann, hvit (1974), Lyset er så hvitt om sommeren (1975), Viviann og Lin (1980) and Søster Viviann (1988) tells the story of an introvert and depressive woman (Viviann) and her way towards joy of life. Among her children's books are I trylleskogen and the prize winning Speilet fanger, both from 1986.

She was awarded Mads Wiel Nygaards Endowment in 1988.

References

1950 births
Living people
Writers from Stockholm
20th-century Norwegian poets
Norwegian children's writers
Norwegian children's book illustrators
Norwegian women illustrators
Norwegian illustrators
20th-century Norwegian novelists
21st-century Norwegian novelists
Norwegian women novelists
Norwegian women children's writers
21st-century Norwegian women writers
20th-century Norwegian women writers
Norwegian women poets